Willard H. Burney (July 5, 1857 – January 20, 1943) was an American politician. He served as a member of the Nebraska Legislature.

Biography
Burney was born in Grant County, Wisconsin. He was a member of the Nebraska House of Representatives as a member of the Republican Party. Burney was a Congregationalist.

Burney married Julia A. Jones in 1880 and they had six children. Their son, Dwight, served as the 30th Governor of Nebraska.

Death
Burney died in 1943 in Hartington, Nebraska and is interred at Hartington Cemetery.

References

External links
 The Political Graveyard
 

People from Grant County, Wisconsin
People from Hartington, Nebraska
Republican Party members of the Nebraska House of Representatives
1857 births
1943 deaths